Wojnówko  is a village in the administrative district of Gmina Okonek, within Złotów County, Greater Poland voivodeship, in west-central Poland.

For more on its history, see Złotów County.

The village has a population of 50.

References

Villages in Złotów County